Plasma Economy was a 1991–1995 plasmapheresis campaign by the Henan provincial government in China, in which blood plasma was extracted in exchange for money. The campaign attracted 3 million donors, most of whom lived in rural China, and it is estimated at least 40% of the blood donors subsequently contracted HIV.

The Plasma Economy campaign boomed due to demand by biotech companies, and became a lucrative source of income for middlemen. The campaign had low health and safety standards, and lacked proper sterilization procedures; needles, blood bags, and other equipment in contact with blood were often recycled and reused. It is estimated that by 2003, over 1.2 million people had contracted AIDS in Henan Province alone.

History
Caijing noted that China's blood donation system is largely monetarily driven, and while attempts had been made in the 1980s to move to a voluntary system, they were mostly unsuccessful. In the early 1990s, China restricted the import of blood products, while calling for local investment by foreign pharmaceutical companies, especially to the province of Henan, where numerous plasmapheresis stations were built. The selling of blood plasma were seen by locals as a method to reduce poverty.

In plasmapheresis, blood plasma is taken from donors, while the remaining blood constituents such as red blood cells are returned to the donor. The blood plasma is then sold to pharmaceutical companies to produce blood-based products. As a cost-cutting measure, some stations mixed several bloods in the same centrifuge, resulting in large-scale blood contamination. As a result, by 1995, such stations were shut down in Henan province, while blood collection was restricted by area, although demand for blood plasma still remained strong.

The impact of the Plasma Economy campaign had a long-lasting effect. It is estimated that by 1999, the Caixian County in Henan had 43% of its blood donors being infected with AIDS, while in the village of Wenlou, over 65% of its residents had contracted HIV.

HIV/AIDS activist Yan Lianke's 2005 book Dream of Ding Village is based on the incident.

A full length play The King of Hell's Palace premiered at London's Hampstead Theatre on 5 September 2019, and gave a dramatisation of the events of the plasma economy scandal in Henan Province in the 90s. It was written by Frances Ya-Cha Cowig, and directed by Michael Boyd.

See also
HIV/AIDS in China
Love for Life
Hu Jia (activist)
Gao Yaojie
Wan Yanhai
HIV/AIDS in Yunnan
Zeng Jinyan
Weiquan movement
Shuping Wang

References

External links
Bad blood behind China's crisis BY Calum MacLeod Monday, 25 June 2001
15 arrested in blood selling scandal By Zhang Feng (China Daily) Updated: 2005-04-14
China blood test lapses fuel "hidden AIDS epidemic" By Ben Blanchard Feb 21, 2006
China's Plasma Economy 05-02 16:04 Caijing Magazine
Danger of AIDS hidden in a large number of plasma stations in Guizhou  Nanfengchuang Magazine Yin Hongwei 2006-06-15
Antiretroviral Therapy for Former Plasma Donors in China: Saving Lives When HIV Prevention Fails
Blood debts Tens of thousands of lives devastated. Not a single official held to account
English translation of "Revealing "Blood Wound" of Spread of HIV AIDS in Henan Province" by He Aifang in CND-Global, January 26, 2001

HIV/AIDS in China
Disasters in Henan
1990s in China
Health disasters in China
1990s health disasters